Huari or Wari is an archaeological site located near the town of Quinua, 22 km northeast of the city of Ayacucho, in the Ayacucho Region, Peru at an elevation between 2600 and 2900 meters. It was the capital city of the Huari Empire and one of the largest urban settlements in ancient Peru.

History 
Huari was founded ca. 400 AD and gained prominence around 550 AD. At its height, the city was inhabited by around 70,000 people from different cultures, making it the center of a new religion that synthesized the beliefs of those various peoples. The city was abandoned ca. 1000 AD.

Layout 
The archaeological site spans an area of 2000 hectares, and comprises several areas or neighborhoods. Buildings are made of stone and mudbrick, and painted in red and white. Many of the structures had residential, administrative or religious purposes.

See also

Cultural periods of Peru
Chuqi Pukyu
Northern Wari ruins
Wari Empire

References

External links
  National Geographic Magazine:  “Empires of the Sun”, by Virginia Morell (Published: June 2002)

Archaeological sites in Peru
Former populated places in Peru
Archaeological sites in Ayacucho Region
Wari culture